Phillip Buford Davidson Jr. (November 26, 1915 – February 7, 1996) was an American lieutenant general who served in World War II, the Korean War, and the Vietnam War.

Biography
Davidson was born on November 26, 1915, in Hachita, New Mexico. Davidson attended West Point, graduating in 1939. During World War II, he served as assistant intelligence officer in the 96th Infantry Division. Later, he served as a squadron commander in George Patton's Third Army.

Following the war, he was assigned as an instructor to the Army's School of Intelligence in Fort Leavenworth, Kansas.

Starting in 1948 and continuing throughout the Korean War, Davidson was chief, Plans and Estimates Branch, in General Douglas MacArthur's intelligence office. It was during this time that occurred one of the US Army's greatest intelligence failures in history - not predicting Chinese intervention in the Korean War.

In 1969, while assigned as commanding General of the Army training center at Fort Ord, California, Davidson was the respondent in the United States Supreme Court decision Parisi v. Davidson. In that case, the court granted habeas relief to a soldier seeking an honorable discharge as a conscientious objector.

During the Vietnam War, 1967 until 1969, Davidson was the chief of US intelligence in Vietnam, under the command of William Westmoreland and later Creighton Abrams.  From May 3, 1971, to September 30, 1972, Davidson, then a major general, was the Assistant Chief of Staff for Intelligence, Headquarters, Department of the Army.  He was later promoted to lieutenant general.

In 1988, he published Vietnam at War: The History 1946–1975, which is widely regarded as one of the most comprehensive accounts of the Indochina wars. He followed it up in 1990 with Secrets of the Vietnam War,  where he described his experiences in Vietnam.

Davidson died on February 7, 1996, in San Antonio, Texas. He is buried in Arlington National Cemetery.

Davidson is a member of the Military Intelligence Hall of Fame.

Military decorations
Lieutenant general Davidson received many decorations during his military service:

References

External links
 ANC Explorer
 Phillip B. Davidson, Jr. and Army Intelligence Doctrine

1915 births
1996 deaths
People from Grant County, New Mexico
United States Military Academy alumni
Military personnel from New Mexico
United States Army personnel of World War II
United States Army personnel of the Korean War
United States Army personnel of the Vietnam War
United States Army generals
Recipients of the Distinguished Service Medal (US Army)
Recipients of the Silver Star
Recipients of the Legion of Merit
Intelligence analysts
Burials at Arlington National Cemetery